Westminster School is a private, coeducational college-preparatory, boarding and day school located in Simsbury, Connecticut accepting around 20% of applicants. The total student population is approximately 400, and includes pupils from 25 US states and 30 countries. It is also a member of the Founders League, an athletic league comprising ten college preparatory boarding schools in Connecticut and one in New York.

History

Westminster School was founded in 1888 as a boys' school by William Lee Cushing, a graduate of Yale University. Girls were first admitted to the school in 1971. Like many boarding schools, Westminster faced difficult times in the 1970s as it competed for a shrinking pool of boarding students. When Donald Werner retired in 1993, after serving as Headmaster for 21 years, he was succeeded by Graham Cole. During the Cole years, enrollment for the school grew from 340 to 385 students, with 88 faculty.

Significant building projects undertaken include:
 Edge House. Designed by Westminster alumnus Graham Gund and built in 1996, Edge House houses 33 students and three faculty families.

 Kohn Squash Pavilion. Completed in the Spring of 2000, The Squash Pavilion contains eight squash courts around a stepped viewing area with natural light from skylights above. The team rooms, locker rooms, and other support spaces are located on a second floor mezzanine overlooking the viewing area and squash courts below.
 Sherwin Health & Athletic Center. Completed in 2003, the Sherwin Health & Athletic Center, the Hibbard Aquatic Center and the Health & Counseling Center is a multipurpose building. The Aquatic Center contains an eight lane competition pool with support facilities and a viewing area on the mezzanine floor.
 Armour Academic Center. This 85,000-square-foot Center houses the Humanities, Math and Science departments, library, and administration. Building features include a centrally located atrium, two-story library, classrooms and laboratories, 120-seat lecture hall, planetarium, faculty and administrative offices, and a variety of lounge spaces.

With Cole's retirement in 2010, Westminster appointed William V.N. Philip as its eighth Headmaster. Philip ascended to the top job after a 26-year career at Westminster as a teacher, coach, dormitory parent, college counselor, and Associate and Assistant Headmaster. Philip stepped down at the end of the 2020-21 academic year.

Elaine B. White was appointed the ninth Head of School in 2021. Prior to her arrival at Westminster, Elaine was Associate Head of School at The Governor’s Academy.

Faculty and staff

Headmasters

 1988-1920: William Lee Cushing
 1920-1922: Lemuel Gardner Pette
 1922-1936: Raymond McOrmond
 1936-1956: Arthur Milliken 

 1956-1970: Francis Keyes 
 1970-1993: Donald H. Werner
 1993-2010: W. Graham Cole, Jr.
 2010–2021: William V.N. Philip 
 2021–Present: Elaine B. White

Student activities

Athletics

A student tradition, dating as far back as the 1920s, is stickball, a game in which teams made up of dormitory floors and day student teams compete in a baseball-like game on the quad and athletic fields in late spring. Each floor makes its own bat, usually a hockey or lacrosse stick that has been cut, or a wooden dowel of a large diameter.  Generally the stickball "season" will culminate in a single-elimination tournament to crown the Hill Stickball champion.

Theater
Each year the theater program stages three productions in the Werner Centennial Theater: one dramatic production spanning the varied genre of Western theater, a musical production, and the student-directed performances, which offer advanced students the opportunity to direct. Each of these productions offers many opportunities for student involvement and leadership, both on stage and backstage.

Situated at the northeastern corner of the campus’s central quadrangle, Centennial Center was upgraded in 1988 into a 30,000 square-foot building including a two-story lobby, a 400-seat, multi-use Shakespearean-style theater, music and dance studios and rehearsal room, dressing rooms, a scene shop/laboratory and other production support spaces. Particular to the “courtyard” theater form, all 400 seats are within 40 feet of the front of the stage, and there is built-in flexibility for both audience size and style of production.

Notable alumni

 William Acquavella, art dealer, head of Acquavella Galleries
 Lake Bell '97, actress
 Eric Boguniecki, NHL hockey player
 Ethan Brooks '91, NFL football player
 Joy Bryant '92, actress
 William S. Beinecke, ‘32, Namesake of Yale University’s Beinecke Rare Book and Manuscript Library
 Tommy Cross '08, Boston Bruins 2nd round draft pick and currently with the Columbus Blue Jackets
 David Doubilet '65, National Geographic photographer
 Jack Du Brul, writer
 Patrick Ellis, radio personality
 Andrew Firestone '94, The Bachelor TV series
 Peter Fonda, actor
 Bryan Nash Gill, '80, artist
 Graham Gund '59, architect
 Bertil Hille
 John William Kilbreth, 1894, U.S. Army brigadier general
 Alec Musser, actor
 Ben Smith '06, NHL Hockey player
 John V. Tunney '52, former United States Senator and Representative from the state of California
 Wellesley Wild '90, writer and executive producer of Family Guy

References

External links
 

Preparatory schools in Connecticut
Private high schools in Connecticut
Boarding schools in Connecticut
Educational institutions established in 1888
Buildings and structures in Simsbury, Connecticut
Schools in Hartford County, Connecticut
1888 establishments in New York (state)